Southern Pacific Company's MC-6 class of steam locomotives is made up of two batches: the first consisting of 15 locomotives weighing  built in 1912, the second consisting of 5 locomotives weighing  built in 1913.  All of the locomotives were built by Baldwin Locomotive Works.  This was the last class of 2-8-8-2 locomotives that Southern Pacific (SP) ordered as cab forward locomotives.

Locomotive number 4043, the newest of the early class of MC-6 locomotives, was displayed at the Panama–Pacific International Exposition along with SP's first locomotive, C. P. Huntington.

The last three were thus rebuilt in 1937. During the rebuild, 4¼-BL Worthington feedwater heaters were also installed on the fireman's side of the locomotives.

After their rebuilds, the locomotives were used through the end of World War II with the last one scrapped on August 20, 1949.

References 
 

MC-6
2-8-8-2 locomotives
Baldwin locomotives
Mallet locomotives
Steam locomotives of the United States
Railway locomotives introduced in 1912
Scrapped locomotives
Standard gauge locomotives of the United States